Vittorio Tosto (born 14 June 1974 in Marina di Cariati, Cosenza) is an Italian footballer who plays as a defender.

References

External links

1974 births
Living people
Italian footballers
Italy under-21 international footballers
U.S. Salernitana 1919 players
Torino F.C. players
S.S.D. Lucchese 1905 players
U.S. Avellino 1912 players
U.C. Sampdoria players
Piacenza Calcio 1919 players
S.S.C. Napoli players
Genoa C.F.C. players
Ascoli Calcio 1898 F.C. players
Empoli F.C. players
Serie A players
Serie B players
Association football defenders
Sportspeople from the Province of Cosenza
ACF Fiorentina players
Footballers from Calabria